The 2014–15 FA Youth Cup was the 63rd edition of the FA Youth Cup.

Chelsea defended the title, beating Manchester City in the final.

Calendar

Preliminary round

Notes:
 † = After Extra Time

First qualifying round

Notes:
 † = After Extra Time

Second qualifying round

Notes:
 † = After Extra Time

Third qualifying round

Notes:
 † = After Extra Time

First round

Notes:
 † = After Extra Time

Second round

Notes:
 † = After Extra Time

Third round

Notes:
 † = After Extra Time

Fourth round

Notes:
 † = After Extra Time

Fifth round

Notes:
 † = After Extra Time

Quarter-finals

First leg

Second leg

Final

First leg

Second leg

Chelsea won 5–2 on aggregate.

See also
 2014–15 Professional U18 Development League
 2014–15 Under-21 Premier League Cup
 2014–15 FA Cup
 2014–15 in English football

References

External links
 The FA Youth Cup at The Football Association official website

FA Youth Cup seasons
FA
Fa Youth Cup, 2014-15